Callum Voisin (born 6 March 2006) is a British-Swiss racing driver currently set to compete in the GB3 Championship for Rodin Carlin.

Voisin was one of the final ten candidates for the Aston Martin Autosport BRDC Award in 2022.

Career

Ginetta Junior Championship 
Voisin began his car racing career at the age of 15 in the Ginetta Junior Championship at R Racing.

GB3 Championship

2022 
In 2022 Voisin progressed to the GB3 Championship with Carlin, partnering Javier Sagrera and Roberto Faria. Having started out with an unremarkable round at Oulton Park, Voisin would score his first top five finish at the next event in Silverstone, before tasting victory for the first time in single-seaters, winning Race 1 at Donington. He continued impressing at the following round, held at Snetterton Circuit, where he scored another victory after taking his first pole position in the series. Another podium came in Race 3 at Spa-Francorchamps, where, having originally been declared the winner, a red flag regulation denied Voisin first place, with victory being instead awarded to Tommy Smith. The following week, the Briton scored a pair of pole positions, which, despite him failing to convert them into wins, yielded two second places. Voisin ended his season by taking another victory at Donington Park, which left him fourth in the overall standings, ahead of his two teammates. In addition, Voisin won the Jack Cavill Pole Position Cup for amassing the highest number of pole positions throughout the campaign.

2023 
Voision remained with the renamed Rodin Carlin for the 2023 GB3 Championship.

USF Pro Championship 
At the end of October 2022, Voisin took part in a USF Pro 2000 Championship test at the Indianapolis Motor Speedway with Jay Howard Driver Development.

Racing record

Racing career summary 

* Season still in progress.

Complete GB3 Championship results 
(key) (Races in bold indicate pole position) (Races in italics indicate fastest lap)

References

External links 
 
 

Living people

2006 births
Swiss people of British descent
Swiss racing drivers
BRDC British Formula 3 Championship drivers
Carlin racing drivers
Ginetta Junior Championship drivers